The Ch'ŏnji Lubricant Factory, located in Hanggu-guyŏk, Namp'o, North Korea, is a factory producing various lubricating oils and greases and transformer oils. On 5 August 2014 Kim Jong Un visited the factory, proclaiming the factory's products to be "as good as the imported ones". The factory is served by a railway connection to Sinnamp'o Station on the P'yŏngnam Line of the Korean State Railway.

References

Manufacturing companies of North Korea